Ashley Walker may refer to:

 Ashley Walker (cricketer), English cricketer
 Ashley Walker (astrochemist), American astrochemist, science communicator, and activist
 Ashley Walker (basketball), American-Romanian basketball player